Rickson George Maomaoru  is an  Anglican bishop: since his episcopal consecration on 22 October 2017, he has been Assistant Bishop of Malaita, one of the nine dioceses that make up the Anglican Church of Melanesia.

References

Anglican bishops of Malaita
21st-century Anglican bishops in Oceania
Year of birth missing (living people)
Living people